The 2012 United States House of Representatives election in Guam was held on Tuesday, November 6, 2012 to elect the non-voting Delegate to the United States House of Representatives from Guam.  The election coincided with the elections of other federal offices, including a quadrennial presidential election.

The non-voting delegate is elected for two-year terms.  Democratic incumbent Madeleine Bordallo, who has represented the district since 2003, won re-election for a sixth consecutive, two-year term,

Candidates

Democratic candidates
 Madeleine Bordallo, incumbent Delegate
 Karlo Dizon, former energy non-governmental organization official and campaign staffer
 Patrick Iriarte (running as a write-in)

Declined
 Carl T.C. Gutierrez, former Governor

Republican candidates
 Frank F. Blas Jr., Guam Senate Minority Leader and son of former Lieutenant Governor Frank Blas

Independent
 Jonathan Diaz (I), former teacher at the University of Guam

Primary election results

Democratic Party

Congresswoman Bordallo's Democratic challenger, Karlo Dizon, endorsed her for re-election following the primary.

Republican Party

Independent

General election results

See also
 United States House of Representatives election in Guam, 2010

References

External links
Office of Governor of Guam

Guam

2012
2012 Guam elections